Guinevere, also often written in Modern English as Guenevere or Guenever, was, according to Arthurian legend, an early-medieval queen of Great Britain and the wife of King Arthur. First mentioned in popular literature in the early 12th century, nearly 700 years after the purported times of Arthur, Guinevere has since been portrayed as everything from a fatally flawed, villainous and opportunistic traitor to a noble and virtuous lady. Many records of the legend also feature the variably recounted story of her abduction and rescue as a major part of the tale.

The earliest datable appearance of Guinevere is in Geoffrey of Monmouth's pseudo-historical British chronicle Historia Regum Britanniae, in which she is seduced by Mordred during his ill-fated rebellion against Arthur. In a later medieval Arthurian romance tradition from France, a prominent story arc is the queen's tragic love affair with her husband's chief knight and trusted friend, Lancelot, indirectly causing the death of Arthur and the downfall of the kingdom. This motif had originally appeared in nascent form in the poem Lancelot prior to its vast expansion in the prose cycle Lancelot-Grail, consequently forming much of the narrative core of Thomas Malory's seminal English compilation Le Morte d'Arthur. Other themes found in Malory and other texts include Guinevere's usual barrenness, the scheme of Guinevere's evil twin to replace her, and the particular hostility displayed towards Guinevere by her sister in law Morgan.

Guinevere has continued to be a popular character featured in numerous adaptations of the legend since the 19th-century Arthurian revival. Many modern authors, usually following or inspired by Malory's telling, typically still show Guinevere in her illicit relationship with Lancelot as defining her character. In much of more recent Arthuriana, however, she assumes much more active roles than in her medieval depictions, increasingly even being cast as protagonist.

Name

The original Welsh form of the name  (also Guenhuibhar, Gwenhwyvar), which seems to be cognate with the Irish name , can be translated as "The White Fay/Ghost", from Proto-Celtic *Windo- "white" + *sēbro "phantom" (cognate with Old Irish síabar "a spectre, phantom, supernatural being [usually in pejorative sense]"). Gwenhwyfach (also spelled Gwenhwyach) appears in Welsh literature as a sister of Gwenhwyfar, but Welsh scholars Melville Richards and Rachel Bromwich both dismiss this etymology (with Richards suggesting that Gwenhwyfach was a back-formation derived from an incorrect interpretation of Gwenwhy-far as Gwenhwy-fawr). A cognate name in Modern English is Jennifer, from Cornish.

The name is given as Guennuuar (Guennimar) in an early Latin text Vita Gildae. The latter form was retained by the authors of Chrétien-influenced French prose cycles, who would use also its variants such as Genievre (Genièvre) or Gueneure. Her many other various names appearing through the different periods and regions of medieval Europe include both Gaynour and Waynour (Waynor[e]) in the English poems Alliterative Morte Arthure and The Awntyrs off Arthure, Genure (Gaynor) in the Stanzaic Morte Arthur, Guenloie in the Romanz du reis Yder, Guenore in Sir Gawayn and þe Grene Knyȝt, Gwenvere (Guennevere, Guenera, Gwenner) in the Polychronicon, and Gwendoloena (Gwendolen) in De Ortu Waluuanii. Her name is invariably Ginover (Ginovere) in the Middle German romances by Hartmann von Aue and Ulrich von Zatzikhoven but was written Jenover by Der Pleier, and the audience of Italian romances got to know her as Ginevra (Zenevra, Zenibra). In the 15th-century Britain, she was called Gwynnever in the Middle Cornish play Bewnans Ke, while the Middle English author Thomas Malory originally wrote her name as Gwenever or Gwenivere (Guenever, Guenivere) in his seminal compilation Le Morte d'Arthur. Some assorted other forms of her name in the Middle Ages and Renaissance literature of various countries and languages have included Ganor, Ganora, Gainor, Gainovere, Geneura, Guanora, Gueneour, Guenevera, Gwenore, Gwinore, Ntzenebra, Vanour, Vanore (Wanore).

Medieval literature

Family relations

In one of the Welsh Triads (no. 56), the 13th-century series of texts based on the earlier oral tales of the bards of Wales, there are three Gwenhwyfars married to King Arthur. The first is the daughter of Cywryd of Gwent, the second of Gwythyr ap Greidawl, and the third of  Gawr ("the Giant"). In a variant of another Welsh Triad (no. 54), only the daughter of Gogfran Gawr is mentioned. There was once a popular folk rhyme known in Wales concerning Gwenhwyfar: "Gwenhwyfar ferch Ogrfan Gawr / Drwg yn fechan, gwaeth yn fawr (Gwenhwyfar, daughter of Ogrfan Gawr / Bad when little, worse when great)."

Welsh tradition remembers the queen's sister Gwenhwyfach and records the enmity between them. Two Triads (no. 53, 84) mention Gwenhwyfar's contention with her sister, which was believed to be the cause of the disastrous Battle of Camlann. In the Welsh prose Culhwch and Olwen (possibly the first known text featuring Guinevere if indeed correctly dated c. 1100), Gwenhwyfach is also mentioned alongside Gwenhwyfar; in some later prose romances, she appears as Guinevere's evil twin. German romance Diu Crône gives Guinevere two other sisters by their father, King Garlin of Gore: Gawain's love interest Flori and Queen Lenomie of Alexandria.

Guinevere is childless in most stories. The few exceptions of that include Arthur's son named Loholt or Ilinot in Perlesvaus and Parzival (first mentioned in Erec and Enide). In the Alliterative Morte Arthure, Guinevere willingly becomes Mordred's consort and bears him two sons, although the dying Arthur commands Mordred's infant children to be killed (yet Guinevere herself to be spared, as he forgives her). There are mentions of Arthur's sons in the Welsh Triads, though their exact parentage is not clear. Besides the issue of her biological children, or lack thereof, Guinevere also raises the illegitimate daughter of Sagramore and Senehaut in the Livre d'Artus.

Other relations are equally obscure. A half-sister and a brother named Gotegin play the antagonistic roles in the Vulgate Cycle (Lancelot–Grail) and Diu Crône respectively, but neither character is mentioned elsewhere (besides the Vulgate-inspired tradition). While later literature almost always named King Leodegrance as Guinevere's father, her mother was usually unmentioned, although she was sometimes said to be dead (this is the case in the Middle English romance The Adventures of Arthur, in which the ghost of Guinevere's mother appears to her and Gawain in Inglewood Forest). Some works name cousins of note, though these too do not usually appear more than once. One of such cousins is Guiomar, an early lover of Morgan le Fay in several French romances; other cousins of Guinevere include her confidante Elyzabel (Elibel) and Morgan's knight Carrant (or Garaunt, apparently Geraint). In Perlesvaus, after the death of Guinevere, her relative King  d'Oriande is major villain who invades Arthur's lands trying to force him to abandon Christianity and to marry his sister, Queen Jandree.

Portrayals

The earliest datable mention of Guinevere (as Guanhumara, with numerous spelling variations in the surviving manuscripts) is in Geoffrey's Historia, written c. 1136. It relates that Guinevere, described as one of the great beauties of Britain, was descended from a noble Roman family on her mother's side and educated under Cador, Duke of Cornwall. Arthur leaves her as a regent in the care of his nephew Modredus (Mordred) when he crosses over to Europe to go to war with the Roman leader Lucius Tiberius. While her husband is absent, Guinevere is seduced by Modredus and marries him, and Modredus declares himself king and takes Arthur's throne. Consequently, Arthur returns to Britain and fights Modredus at the fatal Battle of Camlann. The Roman de Brut (Geste des Bretons) makes Mordred’s love for Guinevere the very motive of his rebellion.

Early texts tend to portray her inauspiciously or hardly at all. One of them is Culhwch and Olwen, in which she is mentioned as Arthur's wife Gwenhwyfar, but little more is said about her. It can not be securely dated; one recent assessment of the language by linguist Simon Rodway places it in the second half of the 12th century. The works of Chrétien de Troyes were some of the first to elaborate on the character Guinevere beyond simply the wife of Arthur. This was likely due to Chrétien's audience at the time, the court of Marie, Countess of Champagne, which was composed of courtly ladies who played highly social roles.

Later authors use her good and bad qualities to construct a deeper character who plays a larger role in the stories. In Chrétien's Yvain, the Knight of the Lion, for instance, she is praised for her intelligence, friendliness, and gentility. On the other hand, in Marie de France's probably late-12th-century Anglo-Norman poem Lanval (and Thomas Chestre's later Middle English version, Sir Launfal), Guinevere is a vindictive adulteress and temptress who plots the titular protagonist's death after failing to seduce him. She ends up punished when she is magically blinded by his secret true love from Avalon, the fairy princess Lady Tryamour (identified by some as the figure of Morgan le Fay). Guinevere herself wields magical powers in The Rise of Gawain, Nephew of Arthur.

Such stories can be radically different in their depictions of Guinevere and the manners of her demise. In the Italian 15th-century romance La Tavola Ritonda, Guinevere drops dead from grief upon learning of her husband's fate after Lancelot rescues her from the siege by Arthur's slayer Mordred. In Perlesvaus, it is Kay's murder of Loholt that causes Guinevere to die of anguish and she is then buried in Avalon with her son's severed head. Alternatively, in what Arthurian scholars Geoffrey Ashe and Norris J. Lacy call one of "strange episodes" of Ly Myreur des Histors, a romanticized historical/legendary work by Belgian author Jean d'Outremeuse, Guinevere is a wicked queen who rules with the victorious Mordred until she is killed by Lancelot, here the last of the Knights of the Round Table; her corpse is then entombed with the captured Mordred who eats it before starving to death. Layamon's Brut features a prophetic dream sequence in which Arthur himself hacks Guinevere to pieces after beheading Mordred. Historically, the bones of Guinevere were claimed to have been found buried alongside those of Arthur during the exhumation of their purported graves by the monks of Glastonbury Abbey in 1091.

Abduction stories 
Welsh cleric and author Caradoc of Llancarfan, who wrote his Life of Gildas sometime between 1130 and 1150, recounts her being kidnapped and raped (violatam et raptam) by Melwas, king of the "Summer Country" (Aestiva Regio, perhaps meaning Somerset), and held prisoner at his stronghold at Glastonbury. The story states that Arthur spent a year searching for her and assembling an army to storm Melwas' fort when Gildas negotiates a peaceful resolution and reunites husband and wife. A seemingly related account was carved into the archivolt of Modena Cathedral in Italy, which most likely predates that telling (as well as any other known written account of Arthurian legend). Here, Artus de Bretania and Isdernus approach a tower in which Mardoc is holding Winlogee, while on the other side Carrado (most likely Caradoc) fights Galvagin (Gawain) as the knights Galvariun and Che (Kay) approach. Isdernus is most certainly an incarnation of Yder (Edern ap Nudd), a Celtic hero whose name appears in Culhwch and Olwen. Yeder is actually Guinevere's lover in a nearly-forgotten tradition mentioned in Béroul's 12th-century Tristan. This is reflected in the later Romance of King Yder, where his lover is Queen Guenloie of Carvain (possibly Caerwent in Wales).

Chrétien de Troyes tells another version of Guinevere's abduction, this time by Meliagant (Maleagant, derived from Melwas) in the 12th-century Lancelot, the Knight of the Cart. The abduction sequence is largely a reworking of that recorded in Caradoc's work, but here the queen's rescuer is not Arthur (or Yder) but Lancelot, whose adultery with the queen is dealt with for the first time in this poem. In Chrétien's love triangle of Arthur-Guinevere-Lancelot, Guinevere consummated her love affair with Lancelot when Arthur and his knights are trying to rescue Guinevere from the land of Gorre. It has been suggested that Chrétien invented their affair to supply Guinevere with a courtly extramarital lover (as requested by his patroness, princess Marie); Mordred could not be used as his reputation was beyond saving, and Yder had been forgotten entirely. This version has become popular. Today it is most familiar from its expansion in the prose cycles, where Lancelot comes to her rescue on more than one occasion.

There are furthermore several other variants of this motif in medieval literature. In Ulrich's Lanzelet, Valerin, the King of the Tangled Wood, claims the right to marry her and carries her off to his castle in a struggle for power that reminds scholars of her prescient connections to the fertility and sovereignty of Britain. Arthur's company saves her, but Valerin kidnaps her again and places her in a magical sleep inside another castle surrounded by snakes, where only the powerful sorcerer Malduc can rescue her. In Diu Crône, Guinevere's captor is her own brother Gotegrim, intending to kill her for refusing to marry Gasozein who claims to be her rightful husband, and her saviour is Gawain. In Durmart le Gallois, Guinevere is delivered from her peril by the eponymous hero. In the Livre d'Artus, she is briefly taken prisoner by King Urien during his rebellion against Arthur. The 14th-century Welsh poet Dafydd ap Gwilym alludes to Guinevere's abduction in two of his poems.

A version of the narrative of Guinevere is associated in local folklore with Meigle in Scotland, known for its carved Pictish stones. One of the stones, now in the Meigle Sculptured Stone Museum, is said to depict Vanora, the local name for Guinevere. She is said to have been abducted by King Modred (Mordred). When she is eventually returned to Arthur, he has her condemned to death for infidelity and orders that she be torn to pieces by wild beasts, an event said to be shown on Meigle Stone 2 (Queen Venora's Stone). This stone was one of two that originally stood near a mound that is identified as Vanora's grave. Modern scholars interpret the Meigle Stone 2 as a depiction of the Biblical tale of Daniel in the lions' den. One Scotland-related story takes place in Hector Boece's Historia Gentis Scotorum, where Guinevere is taken by the Picts following Mordred's and Arthur's deaths at Camlann and spends the rest of her life in their captivity; after her death she is buried beside Arthur.

Medievalist Roger Sherman Loomis suggested that this recurring motif shows that Guinevere "had inherited the role of a Celtic Persephone" (a figure from Greek mythology). All of these similar tales of abduction by another suitor – and this allegory includes Lancelot, who whisks her away when she is condemned to burn at the stake for their adultery – are demonstrative of a recurring 'Hades-snatches-Persephone' theme, positing that Guinevere is similar to the Celtic Otherworld bride Étaín, whom Midir, king of the Underworld, carries off from her earthly life.

Life in popular tradition

In the 13th-century French cyclical chivalric romances and the later works based on them, including the influential Le Morte d'Arthur by Thomas Malory, Guinevere is the daughter of King Leodegrance, who had served Arthur's father Uther Pendragon and was entrusted with the Round Table after Uther's death. In these stories, Leodegrance's kingdom typically lies near the Breton city of Carhaise (the modern Carhaix-Plouguer in Brittany, France). In the fields to the south and east of Carhaise, Arthur defends Leodegrance by defeating King Rience, which leads to his first meeting with the young Guinevere. An arranged marriage of state soon commences and Arthur receives the Round Table as Guinevere's dowry. This version of the legend has her betrothed to Arthur early in his career, while he was garnering support and being pressured to produce an heir (which Guinevere, barren as in most other versions, will fail to deliver). Malory has Arthur also ignore Merlin's prophetic advice warning him not to marry her.

The following narrative is largely based on the Lancelot-Grail (Vulgate) prose cycle, telling the story of Lancelot and Guinevere in accordance to the courtly love conventions still popular in the early 13th-century France (Guinevere's role in this romance is Lancelot's "female lord", just as the Lady of the Lake is his "female master"), however soon afterwards directly condemned in the Post-Vulgate Cycle retelling that also influenced Malory. When the mysterious White Knight (Lancelot) arrives from the continent, Guinevere is instantly smitten. The teenage Lancelot first joins the Queen's Knights to serve Guinevere after having been knighted by her. Following Lancelot's early rescue of Guinevere from Maleagant (in Le Morte d'Arthur this episode only happens much later on) and his admission into the Round Table, and with the Lady of the Lake's and Galehaut's assistance, the two then begin an escalating romantic affair that in the end will inadvertently lead to Arthur's fall.

Lancelot refuses the love of many other ladies, dedicates all his heroic deeds to Guinevere's honor, and sends her the redeemable knights he has defeated in battle and who must appeal to her for forgiveness. In the Vulgate Cycle, Lancelot's stepmother Ninianne, the Lady of the Lake gifts them an identical pair of magic rings of protection against enchantements. In this version, the lovers spend their first night together just as Arthur sleeps with the beautiful Saxon princess named Camille or Gamille (an evil enchantress whom he later continues to love even after she betrays and imprisons him, though it was suggested that he was enchanted). Arthur is also further unfaithful during the episode of the "False Guinevere" (who had Arthur drink a love potion to betray Guinevere), her own twin half-sister (born on the same day but from a different mother) whom Arthur takes as his second wife in a very unpopular bigamous move, even refusing to obey the Pope's order for him not to do it, as Guinevere escapes to live with Lancelot in Galehaut's kingdom of Sorelais. The French prose cyclical authors thus intended to justify Guinevere and Lancelot's adultery by blackening Arthur's reputation and thus making it acceptable and sympathetic for their medieval courtly French audience. Malory's Le Morte d'Arthur, however, portrays Arthur as absolutely faithful to Guinevere, even successfully resisting the forceful advances of the sorceress Annowre for her sake, except as a victim of a spell in a variant of the "False Guinevere" case. On her side, Guinevere is often greatly jealous for Lancelot, especially in the case of Elaine of Corbenic, when her reaction to learning about their relationship (which, unknown to her, by this time has been limited only to him being raped-by-deceit by Elaine, including an earlier act of the fathering of Galahad) causes Lancelot to fall into his longest period of madness (which only Elaine is able to eventually cure with the power of the Holy Grail itself). Malory is silent regarding Guinevere's feelings for Arthur, but goes so far as to suggest she uses charms or enchantments to win Lancelot's love.

Years later, following the Grail Quest, Malory tells his readers that the pair started behaving carelessly in public, stating that "Launcelot began to resort unto the Queene Guinevere again and forget the promise and the perfection that he made in the Quest... and so they loved together more hotter than they did beforehand." They indulged in "privy draughts together" and behaved in such a way that "many in the court spoke of it." Guinevere is charged with adultery on three occasions, including once when she is also accused of sorcery. Their now not-so secret affair is finally exposed by Guinevere's sworn enemy and Arthur's half-sister, the enchantress Morgan le Fay who had schemed against her on various occasions (sometimes being foiled in that by Lancelot, who had also defended Guinevere on many other occasions and performed assorted feats in her honour), and proven by two of the late King Lot's sons, Agravain and Mordred. Revealed as a betrayer of his king and friend, Lancelot kills several of Arthur's knights and escapes. Incited to defend honour, Arthur reluctantly sentences his wife to be burned at the stake. Knowing Lancelot and his family would try to stop the execution, the king sends many of his knights to defend the pyre, though Gawain refuses to participate. Lancelot arrives with his kinsmen and followers and rescues the queen. Gawain's unarmed brothers Gaheris and Gareth are killed in the battle (among others, including fellow Knights of the Round Aglovale, Segwarides and Tor, and originally also Gawain's third brother Agravain), sending Gawain into a rage so great that he pressures Arthur into a direct confrontation with Lancelot.

Guinevere later returns to Arthur from Lancelot's castle and is forgiven (Arthur starts to doubt that Guinevere ever betrayed him). When Arthur goes after Lancelot to France, he leaves her in the care of Mordred, who plans to marry the queen himself and take Arthur's throne. While in some versions of the legend (like the Alliterative Morte Arthure, which removed French romantic additions) Guinevere assents to Mordred's proposal, in the tales of Lancelot she hides in the Tower of London, where she withstands Mordred's siege, and later takes refuge in a nun convent. Hearing of the treachery, Arthur returns to Britain and slays Mordred at Camlann, but his wounds are so severe that he is taken to the isle of Avalon by Morgan. During the civil war, Guinevere is portrayed as a scapegoat for violence without developing her perspective or motivation. However, after Arthur's death, Guinevere retires to a convent in penitence for her infidelity. (Malory was familiar with the Fontevraud daughter house at Nuneaton, and given the royal connections of its sister house at Amesbury, he chose Amesbury Priory as the monastery to which Guinevere retires as "abbas and rular", to find her salvation in a life of penance.) Her contrition is sincere and permanent; Lancelot is unable to sway her to come away with him. Guinevere meets Lancelot one last time, refusing to kiss him, then returns to the convent. She spends the remainder of her life as an abbess in joyless sorrow contrasting with her earlier merry nature. Following her death, Lancelot buries her next to Arthur's (real or symbolic) grave.

Modern culture

Modern adaptations of Arthurian legend vary greatly in their depiction of Guinevere, largely because certain aspects of her story must be fleshed out by the modern author. In spite of her iconic doomed romance with Lancelot, a number of modern reinterpretations portray her as being manipulated into her affair with Lancelot, with Arthur being her rightful true love. Others present her love for Lancelot as stemming from a relationship that existed prior to her arranged marriage to Arthur. Some do not include the affair at all.

Literature
 In the Deverry Cycle book Darkspell, the character of Gweniver is a warrior priestess sworn to the Goddess of the Moon in Her Darktime, also known as She of The Sword-Struck Heart. An inspirational warleader, Gweniver is a berserker in combat.
 In Marion Zimmer Bradley's The Mists of Avalon, Gwenhwyfar is brought up by a cold, unloving father, which leaves her with a deep inferiority complex and intense agoraphobia. Failing to produce an heir and unable to be with the love of her life, Lancelot, she falls into a deep depression and – hoping for salvation – becomes an increasingly fanatical Christian. Bradley's version is notable for popularising the Welsh spelling, which many subsequent writers have adopted.
 Guinevere is a supporting character in Gerald Morris' The Squire's Tales. She starts the series as King Arthur's newly-wedded queen and ends it as Sister Arthur, peacefully living in a convent after Arthur's departure.
 Bernard Cornwell's Arthurian series of novels The Warlord Chronicles depicts Guinevere as the princess of Henis Wyren in North Wales. She is fiercely anti-Christian as a devoted follower of the Ancient Egyptian goddess Isis and has ambitions of becoming queen of Dumnonia through her marriage with Arthur, the illegitimate son of Uther Pendragon in the novels. Guinevere is the cause of a civil war in The Winter King and later conspires with Lancelot against Arthur in Enemy of God, albeit later they reconcile as she plays a vital role in the victory at Badon and eventually she and her son accompany the wounded Arthur to exile in Brittany after Camlann at the end of Excalibur.

Other media

 Guinevere is a central character in the 1960 Broadway musical Camelot, in which she was initially portrayed by Julie Andrews, then Sally Ann Howes. She was played by Vanessa Redgrave in the 1967 film adaptation.
 "Guinnevere" was a song written in 1968 by David Crosby that appears on Crosby, Stills and Nash's eponymous debut album.
 Guinevere is portrayed by Cherie Lunghi in the 1981 epic fantasy film Excalibur.
 In the 1983 DC Comics maxi-series Camelot 3000, Guinevere appears reincarnated in the body of Commander Joan Acton, American-born leader of the United Earth Defense Forces, and is reunited with King Arthur to defend Earth from a race of extraterrestrial invaders.
 In the 1992 cartoon series King Arthur and the Knights of Justice, Queen Guinevere is voiced by Kathleen Barr. She is Camelot's queen and the real King Arthur's wife who often wonders about the change in Arthur's demeanor and manner of acting, unaware of him being the time-stranded Arthur King.
 In the 1994 television film Guinevere, she is portrayed by Sheryl Lee. This story follows Guinevere's point of view and offers a more feminist perspective.
 In the American original version of the 1994 cartoon series Princess Gwenevere and the Jewel Riders, Gwenevere (Gwen) is the show's titular main heroine and protagonist, voiced by Kerry Butler in the first season and Jean Louisa Kelly in the second season. Gwen is a daughter of Queen Anya and King Jared from the royal family of the magical kingdom of Avalon, who takes up the sacred Sun Stone and bonds with the flying unicorn named Sunstar to lead the all-girl Jewel Riders on their quest to rescue her mentor Merlin and to defeat the witches Lady Kale (Gwen's evil aunt) and Morgana before they can rule Avalon. It is more than 1,000 after the reign of Arthur, with Gwenevere described as having inherited the qualities of courage, a strong will and impulsiveness from "her famous namesake". She was renamed as Starla for the show's international version, Starla and the Jewel Riders.
 Guinevere is portrayed by Julia Ormond in 1995 film First Knight.
 In the 1998 television miniseries Merlin, Guinevere is played by Lena Headey.
 In the 2002 television series Guinevere Jones, Guinevere is reincarnated into the main protagonist Gwen Jones portrayed by Tamara Hope.
 In the 2004 film King Arthur, Guinevere, played by British actress Keira Knightley, is depicted as a Pictish princess in captivity of a Roman noble family in the far north of Britain. Arthur, charged by Bishop Germanus with escorting the family to safety in light of an impending Saxon invasion, discovers her captivity and liberates her. While travelling back to Roman territory, she introduces Arthur to Merlin who attempts to persuade Arthur to lead the Picts (called Woads in the film) to battle the Saxon army. Once back in Roman territory, their relationship culminates in a brief romance, after which Arthur decides to remain at the Roman outpost to fight the Saxons at Hadrian's Wall while his knights return to Rome. In the climactic Battle of Badon Hill, Guinevere leads a Pictish detachment of archers against the first wave of Saxon invaders and is nearly killed there before being rescued by Lancelot. Following the battle, Arthur and Guinevere are married by Merlin in a ceremony at Stonehenge.
 Guinevere appears in the 2005 animated series King Arthur's Disasters, where she is voiced by Morwenna Banks.
 In the 2005 French television series Kaamelott, and the 2021 film, Guinevere is a humorous and cheerful queen with a big heart, portrayed by Anne Girouard. Her story with Arthur, her true love, is one of the longest slow burns in French television. 
 Guinevere, or Gwen, appears in the 2007 DreamWorks animated film Shrek the Third, as a student at Worcestershire Academy. She is voiced by Latifa Ouaou.
 In the 2008 television series Merlin, Guinevere (called "Gwen" by most of the characters) is portrayed by Angel Coulby and is shown as the daughter of a blacksmith and maid to Morgana along with being her best friend. Elyan the White is portrayed as her brother, and, eventually, one of Arthur's knights. At first, Guinevere is implied as the love interest of Merlin (who is far younger in the series than in usual tales) and is also shown as having an attraction to Lancelot. However, in this version of the story, Guinevere's true love is Arthur. Gwen and Arthur marry, despite Uther's and Morgana's attempts to keep them apart. Following Arthur's death, Gwen becomes the queen regnant of Camelot.
 Guinevere appears in the 2011 television series Once Upon a Time, played by actress . This version of Guinevere is portrayed with a noticeable Castilian accent. She was stated by production in this adaptation to be Lancelot's true love while being deceived and manipulated into continuing her marriage with Arthur by a "fixing" spell that "fixed" all the problems between the two, inadvertently making her forget her love for Lancelot.
 In the 2011 television series Camelot, Guinevere is depicted by Tamsin Egerton. An ambitious and strong-willed woman, she is a great support to Arthur and they develop a strong undeniable attraction. However, she is married to Leontes, one of Arthur's most loyal knights, which frustrates their relationship.
 In the 2016 video game Mobile Legends: Bang Bang, there is a playable character named Guinevere. Unlike in other stories, Guinevere is portrayed as the sister of Lancelot and is instead in a relationship with Gusion Paxley.
 In the 2016 television series Legends of Tomorrow episode "Camelot/3000", Guinevere is portrayed by Elyse Levesque. In the episode, she is a knight who became queen because of her loyalty to Merlin. In response to Sara letting her know of her affection for Guinevere; Sara Lance felt attraction to her, and after Merlin, who was actually Stargirl, confessed her love to King Arthur, she and Sara shared a kiss.
 In the 2020 television series Cursed, Bella Dayne portrays the Viking warrior woman Red Spear also known as Guinevere.
 In the 2020 cartoon series Wizards: Tales of Arcadia, Guinevere is Morgana's friend whose accidental death by her husband Arthur causes Morgana to turn to evil.
 In the 2022 Pixelberry Studios' video game Guinevere, she is the main character who suffers from visions predicting the downfall of both Camelot and Arthur and Lancelot, both of whom the player can have Guinevere romance.

See also
 King Arthur's family
 Tristan and Iseult

References

Bibliography

External links

 Guinevere at The Camelot Project

Amesbury Abbey
Arthurian characters
British traditional history
Fictional characters introduced in the 12th century
Fictional characters who committed sedition or treason
Fictional Christian nuns
Fictional half-giants
King Arthur's family
Mythological princesses
Mythological queens
People whose existence is disputed